Rhelonie is a crofting hamlet in the Highland region of Scotland.

Rhelonie is 2 miles northwest of the village of Culrain and 4 miles northwest of Ardgay. 2 miles west of Rhelonie lies the crofting hamlet of Achnahanat.

Populated places in Sutherland